Sporobolus wrightii is a species of grass known by the common names big sacaton and giant sacaton. It is native to the western United States and northern and central Mexico.

Description
This species is a perennial bunchgrass with thick stems that can reach 2.5 metres tall. The leaves are 20 to 70 centimetres long. The panicle is lance-shaped in outline and up to 60 centimetres long. It contains purplish or greenish spikelets.

Ecology
This plant grows in plains and desert grassland, shrubsteppe, and desert shrubland habitat. It may occur in desert wetland habitat types such as desert marshes, seasonal lakes, and floodplains. In this kind of habitat it is an important species for preventing erosion and slowing runoff by trapping sediments. It may be a common to prominent or dominant species. It dominates some grasslands in its native range, alongside other common grasses. This type of grassland has been reduced to a fraction of its pristine range by forces such as overgrazing and the channelization of water.

This grass provides a good forage for livestock, producing large amounts of green matter. It is an important species for grazers on grasslands in parts of Arizona. It is also valuable for wildlife.

References

External links

wrightii
Bunchgrasses of North America
Grasses of Mexico
Grasses of the United States
Native grasses of California
Native grasses of Oklahoma
Native grasses of Texas
Flora of Aguascalientes
Flora of Arizona
Flora of Baja California Sur
Flora of the California desert regions
Flora of Chihuahua (state)
Flora of the Chihuahuan Desert
Flora of Coahuila
Flora of Colima
Flora of Hidalgo (state)
Flora of the State of Mexico
Flora of New Mexico
Flora of Nuevo León
Flora of San Luis Potosí
Flora of Sinaloa
Flora of the Sonoran Deserts
Flora of Tamaulipas
Flora of Utah
Flora of Zacatecas
Natural history of the Colorado Desert
Flora of the Mexican Plateau
Plants described in 1882